Merve Aydın (born 17 March 1990) is a Turkish middle distance runner. She is a member of Fenerbahce athletics team.

She won a silver medal in the 2008 Bydgoszcz at the 2008 World Junior Championships in Athletics and at the 2011 European Athletics U23 Championships. Merve Aydın repeated her silver medal wins in the 4 × 400 m relay event at the 2011 Summer Universiade held in Shenzhen, China.

Merve Aydın qualified for participation in the 800 m event at the 2012 Summer Olympics. She was injured during the second lap of her qualifying Olympic run on 8 Aug 2012. Despite the injury she refused to withdraw and limped to the finish line coming in last in her heat to a standing ovation with a time of 3:24:35.

Achievements

References

External links

1990 births
People from Bakırköy
Living people
Turkish female middle-distance runners
Olympic athletes of Turkey
Athletes (track and field) at the 2008 Summer Olympics
Enkaspor athletes
Galatasaray athletes
Athletes (track and field) at the 2012 Summer Olympics
Sportspeople from Istanbul
European champions for Turkey
Universiade medalists in athletics (track and field)
Universiade silver medalists for Turkey
Survivor Turkey contestants
Medalists at the 2001 Summer Universiade
Medalists at the 2011 Summer Universiade